Dame Mary Elizabeth Marsh  (born 17 August 1946) is non-executive director of HSBC Bank plc and member of the governing body at London Business School. She is chair of the Royal College of Paediatrics and Child Health (RCPCH) board of trustees.

Early life
Marsh is the daughter of George Donald Falconer and his wife, Lesley Mary née Wilson. She attended Birkenhead High School and then the University of Nottingham, where she graduated with a BSc in Geography. She later obtained a DipEd from Hatfield Polytechnic, and an MBA from the London Business School.

Career
She started her career as a geography teacher at Luton Comprehensive School, and then became deputy head of St Christopher School in Letchworth. She was appointed head teacher of Queens' School in Hertfordshire, and moved to Holland Park School in 1995.

She was the founding director of the Clore Social Leadership Programme from 2008–15, and the chief executive of the National Society for the Prevention of Cruelty to Children (NSPCC) from 2000-08.

Honours
She was decorated as a DBE by HM The Queen in the 2007 New Year Honours list for "services to families and children".

Personal life
A widow, Mary Marsh has four sons and lives in London.

References

External links
Biodata
Marsh wins achievement award

1946 births
Living people
People educated at Birkenhead High School Academy
Alumni of London Business School
Alumni of the University of Nottingham
Schoolteachers from Merseyside
British social welfare officials
Dames Commander of the Order of the British Empire
HSBC people
National Society for the Prevention of Cruelty to Children people
British charity and campaign group workers